The FPS Finance, is a Federal Public Service of Belgium. It was created by Royal Order on 17 February 2002, as part of the plans of the Verhofstadt I Government to modernise the federal administration. It is responsible for the finances of the Federal Government and taxation.

See also
 Minister of Finance (Belgium)

External links
 

Finance
Belgium
Belgium, Finance
2002 establishments in Belgium